Dancing with the Stars: Juniors is an American children's dance competition television series that premiered on October 7, 2018 on ABC. It is a spin-off of the Dancing with the Stars series. The format of the show features celebrity children (either in their own right or having celebrity parentage) paired with professional junior ballroom dancers and mentored by an adult professional dancer. The couples compete against each other by performing choreographed dance routines in front of a panel of judges. In September 2019, ABC decided to cancel the series after one season.

Format
Like Dancing with the Stars, the scores used for eliminations are based 50% on judges' scores and 50% on audience voting. Unlike the parent series, only studio audience members during each week's episode recording vote; there is no at-home voting. The team with the lowest total score after combining votes and judges' scores is eliminated.

Cast

Couples and mentors
On August 1, 2018, the junior professional dancers and adult mentors were revealed. On September 25, during the second episode of season 27 of DWTS, the junior celebrities were announced.

Hosts and judges
Dancing with the Stars season 25 winner Jordan Fisher and finalist Frankie Muniz serve as hosts. Two-time pro champion Valentin Chmerkovskiy, Emmy Award winning choreographer Mandy Moore, and DWTS Athletes celebrity champion Adam Rippon serve as judges.

Dance troupe
The Dancing with the Stars: Juniors troupe consists of Makeila Lawrence, Cody Bingham, Reese Hatala, Sebastian Jozuka, and Daniel Novikov. They are mentored by Dancing with the Stars troupe member Morgan Larson.

Scoring charts

This is the Key for the chart

Red numbers indicate the lowest score for each week
Green numbers indicate the highest score for each week
 the couple eliminated that week
 the winning couple
 One of the runner-up couple(s)

Average score chart
This table only counts dances scored on a 30-point scale.

Highest and lowest scoring performances

The best and worst performances in each dance according to the judges' 30-point scale are as follows:

Couples' highest and lowest scoring dances
Scores are based upon a potential 30-point maximum.

Weekly scores
Individual judges' scores in the chart below (given in parentheses) are listed in this order from left to right: Mandy Moore, Valentin Chmerkovskiy, Adam Rippon.

Week 1: First Dances
The couples danced the cha-cha-cha, foxtrot, jive or salsa.

Running order

Week 2: Song from the Year I Was Born
Unless stated, individual judges' scores in the charts below (given in parentheses) are listed in this order from left to right: Valentin Chmerkovskiy, Mandy Moore, Adam Rippon.

The couples danced one unlearned dance to a song that came out the year the celebrities were born. Argentine tango, paso doble and quickstep were introduced.
Running order

Week 3: Disney Night
The couples performed one unlearned dance to a song from a Disney film. Charleston, contemporary, jazz and samba were introduced.
Running order

Week 4: Halloween Night 
The couples performed one unlearned dance to Halloween themes and songs.

Running order

Week 5: Juniors Choice 
The couples performed one unlearned dance to a song of their choice.

Running order

Week 6: Giving Thanks
The couples performed one unlearned dance dedicated to someone important in their lives.

Running order

Week 7: Time Machine 
The couples performed one unlearned dance to an era of their choice.
Running order

Week 8: Semi-Finals 
The couples performed one unlearned dance and a team fusion dance. No elimination took place.
Running order

Week 9: The Finale 
The couples performed their favorite dance during the competition with their mentor and a holiday-themed freestyle.
Running order

Dance chart 
The celebrities and professional partners will dance one of these routines for each corresponding week:
 Week 1: Cha-cha-cha, foxtrot, jive or salsa (First Dances)
 Week 2: One unlearned dance (Song From the Year I Was Born)
 Week 3: One unlearned dance (Disney Night)
 Week 4: One unlearned dance (Halloween Night)
 Week 5: One unlearned dance (Juniors Choice)
 Week 6: One unlearned dance (Giving Thanks)
 Week 7: One unlearned dance (Time Machine)
 Week 8: One unlearned dance & Team dance (Semi-Finals)
 Week 9: Favourite dance featuring mentor & freestyle (Finale)

 Highest scoring dance
 Lowest scoring dance

Ratings

References

External links

2010s American reality television series
2018 American television series debuts
2018 American television series endings
American Broadcasting Company original programming
American television spin-offs
Ballroom dance
Dancing with the Stars (American TV series)
English-language television shows
Reality television spin-offs
Television series about children
Television series about teenagers
Television series by BBC Studios